Jarl-Thure Eriksson (born 5 November 1944 in Hammarland in Åland, Finland) is Doctor of Science in Technology, Professor of Electrical Engineering and Rector of Tampere University of Technology (TUT) in Finland between the years 1997–2008. During Eriksson's period as rector, the university expanded vigorously and its scientific publishing activity amplified. Due to his scientific merits, Eriksson has been a member of the Finnish Academy of Technology since 1989 and of the Swedish Academy of Engineering Sciences in Finland since 1997. His perhaps most significant position of trust outside the university is membership in the Governing Board of the Millennium Prize Foundation since 2003. He is currently Chancellor of Åbo Akademi University in Turku, Finland.

Career
Eriksson studied electrical engineering at Helsinki University of Technology (TKK). In the 1970s, he worked as researcher at TKK's Low Temperature Laboratory, led by Academy professor Olli Lounasmaa. His research area was superconductivity-based electromagnetic applications, particularly superconducting electric machines. Applications of this research include Finland's large ice-breakers in the 1970s.

In his licentiate thesis in 1976, Eriksson discussed the general design principles of superconducting electric motors and presented a solution to a key problem, namely the transfer of high electric currents between the stator and rotor, and a tentative design for a superconducting motor. The design was implemented in a joint project by TKK and the VTT Technical Research Centre of Finland between the years 1977–1979. The 100-kilowatt motor SUMO was Finland's first and fourth in the world. Due to its current transfer solution, the motor had a wide speed regulation range, which was a key aim in ice-breaker propulsion. In his doctoral dissertation, examined in 1982 at TKK, Eriksson discussed the current transfer system of the SUMO motor, and whirl and instability phenomena in the turbulent flow of liquid metals.

Eriksson worked as associate professor at TKK in 1979. A year later he transferred to the same position to TUT. In 1987, he was appointed full professor at TUT by invitation. Eriksson continued superconductivity research in Tampere, with an aim of utilizing superconductivity in energy technology. In the late 1980s, Eriksson established a development programme related to wind generators, which lead to the construction of a prototype generator based on permanent magnets. Wind power research has later yielded several doctoral dissertations at TUT.

Between the years 1985–86, Eriksson worked as visiting professor at KTH in Stockholm, Sweden, and launched a hybrid car project in cooperation with ASEA (later ABB). The first step of the project was the development of a gas turbine operated high-speed generator by researchers Peter Chudi and Anders Malmquist under the direction of Eriksson. During a further stage of the project, the combination was installed in Volvo's ECC hybrid car which was successfully introduced in the early 1990s.

Energy research directed Eriksson's attention to future studies. Prior to his election as rector, Eriksson's positions included chairmanship in the Finnish Society for Future Studies. As the subject matter required better understanding of extensive systems, Eriksson generated a series of lectures on complex and chaotic systems and the modelling of emergent growth systems. His research focus shifted to the pragmatic interpretations of chaos theory and the utilization of neural network calculation in foresight tasks, such as the optimized control of a wind power plant based on wind forecast or the utilization of the brain's alpha wave in predicting epileptic attacks.

In Eriksson's view, the understanding and modelling of complex systems required better understanding of the human mental functions. In his article “Impact of information compression on intellectual activities in the brain” in 1996 Eriksson presented an information theory based model for cognition. According to the model, humans perceive the real world through the representations of neural networks that are formed by cumulating experiences and learning processes. When brain functions are active, the cerebral cortex processes large volumes of information. Conscious thought is a result of a massive information compression process, which originates from external sensations, such as sight and hearing, or from internal thoughts or associations, and is governed by the context and the emotional state. The condensation of relevant information, which takes place in the subconscious, generates instructions for reactions as well as new cognitive input for the cortex. A conscious thought itself should be considered as the control feedback of what the subconscious has already determined.

Publications
 A 50 kW homopolar motor with superconducting field windings, IEEE Trans. on Magnetics, MAG-17, Nr 1, 1981, pp. 900–903. Co-authors: A. Arkkio, P. Berglund, J. Luomi, M. Savelainen.
 Superconducting homopolar machinery: Liquid metal current collection and design principles. Acta Polytechnica Scandinavica, El.Eng. Series Nr 48, 1982, p. 184. (doctoral dissertation)
 Conditioning of the MHD generator electrical output. Proc. of the 8th Int. Conf. on MHD Electrical Power Generation, Moscow, 1983, pp. 238–243. Co-author P.J. Simola.
 Direct propulsion of blue water vessels. IEEE Trans. on Magnetics, MAG-23, Nr 2, 1987, pp. 2584–2586. Co-authors: L. Kettunen, A. Pohjavirta.
 Superconducting wiggler magnets. 2nd Nordic Symposium on Superconductivity, Röros 1991. Published in Superconducting Technology; 10 case studies, ed. K. Fossheim. World Scientific Publishing Co. pp. 175–184. Co-author: R. Mikkonen.
 Intergrain flux creep in high-Tc superconductors. Physical Review B, Vol. 48, Nr 13, 1993. pp. 9873–9876. Co-author: J. Paasi.
 Order versus disorder - philosophical implications on computability and modelling of complex systems. Proc. of the 1993 International Symposium on non-linear theory and its applications (NOLTA), Hawaij, 1993, pp. 799–802. Co-authors: J. Perttula, T. Tarhasaari.
 A neuro-fuzzy controller and learning algorithm for wind turbines. Proc. of  ICSPAT, Boston, 1995, pp. 1173–1177. Co-author: Li Lin.
 Impact of information compression on intellectual activities in the brain. Int. Journal of Neural Systems, Vol. 7, Nr 4, 1996. pp. 543–550.
 Spontaneous and evoked cortical dynamics during deep anaesthesia. Int. Journal of Neural Systems, Vol. 7, Nr 4, 1996. pp. 481–487. Co-authors: S. Mäkinen, K. Hartikainen, V. Jäntti.

Lecture notes (in Finnish)
 Electrodynamics. 1984/90/94
 Nonlinear and chaotic systems. 1994
 Methods of mathematical modelling. 1995
 Complex systems.  1995

References

1944 births
Living people
People from Hammarland

Rectors of universities and colleges in Finland
Finnish electrical engineers
Åbo Akademi University